The rostral scale, or rostral, in snakes and other scaled reptiles is the median plate on the tip of the snout that borders the mouth opening. It corresponds to the mental scale in the lower jaw. The term pertains to the rostrum, or nose. In snakes, the shape and size of this scale is one of many characteristics used to differentiate species from one another.

Related scales
Nasorostral scale
Mental scale
Labial scales

See also
Snake scales
Anatomical terms of location

References

Snake scales